Escoriandoli is a 1996 Italian surreal comedy film written and directed by Antonio Rezza.  It entered the "Window on Images" section at the 53rd Venice International Film Festival.

Cast 

 Antonio Rezza: Giuliano/Rolando/Prof.ssa Coatta/Giacane/Elio
 Valentina Cervi: Sabrina
 Isabella Ferrari: Tarcisia
 Claudia Gerini: Lauretta
 Valeria Golino: Ida

References

External links

1996 films
Italian comedy films
1996 comedy films
1996 directorial debut films
1990s Italian-language films
1990s Italian films